Kaltouma Nadjina (born November 16, 1976) is a Chadian sprinter. Her specialities are the 200 and 400 metres, and she holds Chadian records in those events, the 100 m, and the 800m. She won the 200 m events at the 2001 Jeux de la Francophonie held in Ottawa, Ontario, Canada and the 200 and 400 m in the 2002 African Championships held in Tunis.

Early life and background
Born in Bol to a modest family, her athletic career began when she participated in 1993 at Moundou to the National Sport Week. Her victory in the 400 metres opened her the road to the selection for the 1994 World Junior Championships held in Lisbon.

In February 1997, with the help of a grant obtained by the International Olympic Committee, she left Chad for the United States. She settled in Savannah, Georgia in 1996. In 2000, she moved to Calgary, Alberta, Canada, where she trained under former Canadian Olympic coach John Cannon.

Athletics career
To this day, her most important victories are the 200 m in the 2001 Jeux de la Francophonie held in Ottawa and the 200 and 400 m in the 2002 African Championships held in Tunis. At the 2002 IAAF World Cup, she finished fifth in the 400 m and fourth in the 4 x 400 m relay. She holds the Chadian records for 100 m, 200 m, 400 m and 800 m.

In 2004, Nadjina competed at the 2004 African Championships in Athletics in Brazzaville, where she won bronze in the 200 metres with a time of 23.29, and silver in the 400 metres with a time of 50.80. In 2005, Nadjina competed at the 2005 Jeux de la Francophonie in Niamey. She won gold medals in both the 200 metres and 400 metres events.

In 2009 she was reprimanded and had a result annulled after a doping violation.

Competition record

References

External links

An interview 

1976 births
Living people
Chadian female sprinters
Athletes (track and field) at the 1996 Summer Olympics
Athletes (track and field) at the 2000 Summer Olympics
Athletes (track and field) at the 2004 Summer Olympics
Olympic athletes of Chad
People from Bol, Chad
Doping cases in athletics
World Athletics Championships athletes for Chad
Goodwill Games medalists in athletics
Competitors at the 2001 Goodwill Games
Athletes (track and field) at the 1999 All-Africa Games
African Games competitors for Chad
Olympic female sprinters